Stu Phillips (born January 19, 1933) is a Canadian-American country singer from Montreal, Quebec. Stu and his wife Aldona operate Long Hollow Winery in Goodlettsville, near Nashville. He is also an ordained Minister in the Episcopal Church. He was a long-time host of CBC's Red River Jamboree. He is also an active member of the Grand Ole Opry. Stu Phillips was part of RCA and featured on their The Best of Country and West volumes 1 and 2 with "Bracero" and "The Last Thing on My Mind". Phillips was inducted into the Canadian Country Music Hall of Fame in 1993. He was ranked #29 in RPM Magazine's top 57 Canadian Country artists from 1964 to 1994.

Discography

Albums

Singles

References

External links
 Stu Phillips' Grand Ole Opry member page
 
 Entry at thecanadianencyclopedia.ca

1933 births
Grand Ole Opry members
Canadian emigrants to the United States
Canadian country singer-songwriters
Living people
Musicians from Calgary
Musicians from Nashville, Tennessee
RCA Victor artists
Sewanee: The University of the South alumni
Singers from Montreal